Remmert Wielinga (born 27 April 1978 in Eindhoven) is a Dutch professional road bicycle racer. Wielinga turned professional in 2001 with the De Nardi–Pasta Montegrappa team. In 2003, he moved to Dutch squad , where he took early victories with a stage win in the Vuelta a Andalucía and the Trofeo Calvià. In 2006, Wielinga moved to the  team, where he took victory in Gran Premio di Chiasso.

Major results

 Gran Premio di Chiasso (2006)
 Trofeo Calvià (2003)
 Vuelta a Andalucía – 1 stage (2003)
  U23 Time Trial Champion (1999–2000)
 National U23 Road Race Championship – 2nd (2000)

External links

Profile at the Saunier Duval-Prodir official website 

1978 births
Living people
Dutch male cyclists
Sportspeople from Eindhoven
UCI Road World Championships cyclists for the Netherlands
Cyclists from North Brabant